Edith Best may refer to:

 Edith Best (musician) (1865–1950), Irish musician